was the seventeenth single of J-pop idol group Morning Musume and was released February 19, 2003. It sold a total of 151,342 copies, reaching number four on the Oricon Charts.

This single is a cover of the theme song to a famous children's puppet show from the 1960s, called Hyokkori Hyoutanjima (ひょっこりひょうたん島).

Track listing

CD 
 
 
 "Morning Musume no Hyokkori Hyōtanjima" (Instrumental)

Single V DVD 
 "Morning Musume no Hyokkori Hyōtanjima"

Members at time of single 
 1st generation: Kaori Iida, Natsumi Abe
 2nd generation: Kei Yasuda, Mari Yaguchi
 4th generation: Rika Ishikawa, Hitomi Yoshizawa, Nozomi Tsuji, Ai Kago
 5th generation: Ai Takahashi, Asami Konno, Makoto Ogawa, Risa Niigaki

References

External links 
 Morning Musume no Hyokkori Hyōtanjima entries on the Up-Front Works official website: CD entry, DVD entry 
 Projecthello.com lyrics: Morning Musume no Hyokkori Hyōtanjima, Hōseki Bako

Morning Musume songs
Zetima Records singles
2003 singles
Japanese-language songs
Song recordings produced by Tsunku